Whitton is a civil parish in the Mid Suffolk district, in the county of Suffolk, England. The parish does not include the Ipswich suburb of Whitton. In 2011 the parish had a population of 172. The parish touches Akenham and Claydon. Whitton shares a parish council with Claydon and Barham.

History 
The parish was formed in 1894 from the rural part of Whitton cum Thurlston, on 1 April 1952 62 acres was transferred from Akenham to Whitton.

References

External links 
 

Civil parishes in Suffolk
Mid Suffolk District